Sreeleela (alternatively spelt as Sree Leela; born 14 June 2001) is an American actress of Indian origin who predominantly appears in Kannada and Telugu films. She debuted in 2019 with Kiss, winning Best Female Debut – Kannada at the SIIMA Awards, and entered Telugu cinema with Pelli SandaD in 2021. She has since starred in the 2022 action comedy Dhamaka.

Personal life
Sree Leela was born on June 14, 2001 into a Telugu-speaking family in the United States and was brought up in Bangalore, India. Her mother, Swarnalatha, is a gynecologist based in Bangalore. Swarnalatha was married to industrialist Surapaneni Subhakara Rao, and Leela was born to Swarnalatha after the couple's separation.

Leela began her training in Bharatanatyam dance as a child. She aspires to become a doctor and as of 2021, was in the final year of her MBBS.

In February 2022, Leela adopted two disabled children.

Career

Director A. P. Arjun came across Leela's pictures, taken by cinematographer Bhuvan Gowda, on social media and cast her in his 2019 film, Kiss. The actress has stated that she chose to start her career in Kannada-language films as she grew up in Bangalore, despite having contacts in Telugu cinema.

Filming for Kiss began in 2017, while Leela was in the first year of her pre-university course. The film was released in 2019 and proved successful at the box office. A. Sharadhaa of The New Indian Express stated that Leela made a confident debut, writing, "Sreeleela looks stylish and garners equal attention." Times of India critic Vinay Lokesh echoed the sentiment by stating that Leela shined in her role. A month later, her second film, Bharaate, opposite Sriimurali, was released. Reviewing her performance for The News Minute, Aravind Shwetha wrote: "Leela is good and holds her own along with Sri Murali when it comes to acting and screen presence." Sharadhaa of The New Indian Express wrote that, "This is Sreeleela's second film, and she seems to be getting comfortable with being in front of the camera, and delivers what the role demands."

In 2021, Leela was cast in the romantic musical film Pelli SandaD, marking her debut in Telugu cinema. The actress described her character as a "role to die for". While the film received negative reviews, Leela's role garnered appreciation from critics. Sangeetha Devi of The Hindu called the film a "costly showreel" of the lead pair, Roshan and Leela, opining that they looked fresh and effervescent but lacked chemistry.

In 2022, Leela starred in the Kannada romantic comedy By Two Love. Appreciating her performance, Sunayana Suresh of The Times of India stated: "Sreeleela steals the show with a role that offers her to be more than just eye candy in a film. She shines especially in the emotional scenes." Sharadhaa of The New Indian Express felt it was "a delight to watch" her in the film. A review from Deccan Herald opined that while she was impressive, Leela's Kannada pronunciation had room for improvement.

Following the success of Pelli SandaD, Leela received multiple offers in Telugu films. The actress has signed on to four projects that are in various stages of production, including the Ravi Teja-starrer Dhamaka. She has been cast in the Telugu-Kannada bilingual film Junior, opposite G. Janardhana Reddy's son, Kireeti Reddy, and a Telugu film directed by Vakkantham Vamsi, opposite Nithiin.

Filmography

Awards and nominations

References

External links
 

Living people
1990 births
American film actresses
American actresses of Indian descent
American people of Telugu descent
Actresses from Bangalore
Telugu actresses
Actresses in Kannada cinema
Actresses in Telugu cinema
American expatriate actresses in India
South Indian International Movie Awards winners
21st-century American actresses
Telugu American